Khatereh (also Romanized as Khāţereh; also known as Khātereh-ye Faraj) is a village in Kashkan Rural District, Shahivand District, Dowreh County, Lorestan Province, Iran. At the 2006 census, its population was 844, in 193 families.

References 

Towns and villages in Dowreh County